Karen Anne Murphy  (born 18 December 1974) is an Australian international lawn bowler and indoor bowler.

Bowls career

World championships
Murphy has won the 2008 World Outdoor Bowls Championship in the fours, 2012 World Outdoor Bowls Championship in the triples and twice in the singles at the 2012 World Outdoor Bowls Championship and the 2016 World Outdoor Bowls Championship. She successfully defended her title in the singles at the 2016 World Outdoor Bowls Championship in Christchurch after defeating Lesley Doig in the final. This achievement is generally agreed to have elevated her to being the best female bowler since Margaret Johnston.

Commonwealth Games
She has won gold medals at the 2006 Commonwealth Games in the pairs. In addition she has won three Commonwealth Games silver medals, the most recent being in the Women's triples at the 2014 Commonwealth Games.

Asia Pacific Championships
She has won a remarkable 13 medals at the Asia Pacific Bowls Championships, of which no less than eight have been gold in colour.

Indoors
In 2012, she also won the World Indoor Bowls Championship title, a fine achievement bearing in mind that she does not compete every year in the event held in England.

Awards
She has also been a guest commentator during the World Indoor Bowls Championships for the BBC. She was a Director for World Bowls from 2014-2018.

Murphy was awarded Member of the Order of Australia (AM) in the 2021 Australia Day Honours, for "For significant service to lawn bowls as an elite player at the international level."

References

1974 births
Living people
Bowls players at the 2014 Commonwealth Games
Commonwealth Games gold medallists for Australia
Commonwealth Games silver medallists for Australia
Australian female bowls players
Bowls World Champions
Commonwealth Games medallists in lawn bowls
Indoor Bowls World Champions
Members of the Order of Australia
People from the Illawarra
Sportswomen from New South Wales
21st-century Australian women
Medallists at the 1998 Commonwealth Games
Medallists at the 2002 Commonwealth Games
Medallists at the 2006 Commonwealth Games
Medallists at the 2014 Commonwealth Games